2022 Adelaide International may refer to:

2022 Adelaide International 1, an ATP 250 and WTA 500 tournament
2022 Adelaide International 2, an ATP 250 and WTA 250 tournament created after several tournaments cancelled by the COVID-19 pandemic